On 9 January 2020, a large group of Islamic State in the Greater Sahara militants assaulted a Nigerien military base at Chinagodrar, in Niger's Tillabéri Region. At least 89 Nigerien soldiers were confirmed to have been killed in the attack with more casualties suspected, but yet to be confirmed. The Nigerien government said that 77 militants were killed.

The Islamist insurgency in the Sahel intensified in the late 2010s. This attack followed those in Niger on 10 and 25 December 2019.

Aftermath
The Nigerien government declared three days of national mourning after the battle. Nigerien President Mahamadou Issoufou fired General Ahmed Mohamed, the chief of the Nigerien Army, and replaced him with Major General Salifou Modi.

References

2020 mass shootings in Africa
2020 murders in Niger
21st-century mass murder in Africa
Attacks on military installations in the 2020s
Battles in 2020

January 2020 crimes in Africa
Mass murder in Niger
Massacres in 2020
Massacres in Africa
Terrorist incidents in Niger in 2020
Tillabéri Region